Road & Track Presents: The Need for Speed is a racing video game developed by EA Canada, originally known as Pioneer Productions, and published by Electronic Arts, released for the 3DO in 1994, and ported to MS-DOS in 1995. Another version of the game, The Need for Speed: Special Edition, was released in 1996 for the Microsoft Windows, PlayStation, and Sega Saturn platforms. The original 3DO version offers eight sports cars, including several exotic models and Japanese imports, and tasks the player with racing in three realistic point-to-point tracks either with or without a computer opponent. Subsequent ports of the game normally include an additional ninth car and have more tracks, including closed circuits. Checkpoints, traffic vehicles, and police pursuits commonly appear in the races.

The game was noted for its realism and audio and video commentaries. Electronic Arts collaborated with automotive magazine Road & Track to match vehicle behaviour, including the mimicking of the sounds made by the vehicles' gear control levers. The game also contained precise vehicle data with spoken commentary, several "magazine-style" images of each car's interior and exterior and short video clips highlighting the vehicles set to music.

The Need for Speed was a commercial success. Video game publications praised the incorporation of realism into the gameplay and graphics, as well as the inclusion of full motion videos. It is the first installment released in the Need for Speed series, which has influenced several racing games. It was also sold in Japan as Overdrivin' DX.

Gameplay 

The premise of The Need for Speed involves racing in sports cars, including several exotic models and Japanese imports. The original 3DO version includes three point-to-point tracks, each divided into three stages; subsequent ports feature both the point-to-point tracks and new closed circuits. The Saturn and PlayStation versions include an additional three tracks. Traffic vehicles appear in races, and may be avoided by the player. Police pursuits are also a key gameplay mechanic, with the player ticketed or arrested if a police car succeeds in catching up with them. Players are arrested if they receive a third police ticket (or a second ticket in the Sega Saturn version). In the special edition, completing the tournaments (or entering a cheat) unlocks the "rally" mode, where car dynamics are changed to make for a faster 'arcade' experience, as well as the "Warrior PTO E/2", a fictional jet-powered sports car.

Except for the aforementioned Warrior, each car in the game comes with detailed specifications, history, audio commentaries and real-life videos, which would also be featured in subsequent games in the series, though this was omitted in later games. A replay feature allowed the player to view a saved race. Multiple camera views, playback speed and video navigation are offered.

Multiplayer consists of a two-player head-to-head racing mode, which requires computers connected via modem.

There are a total of six courses in the game (three in the 3DO version): City, Coastal, Alpine, Rusty Springs, Autumn Valley and Vertigo. Each is a distinctive environment. City, Coastal and Alpine have three sections each, while the others are circuit races.

There is an extra track in the game, named Lost Vegas, which can be unlocked by winning all of the tracks above in tournament mode. A flag in the bottom right corner of the track's image indicates a victory in the menu to help the player keep track of the progress.

Development and release 

The Need for Speed was noted for its realism and audio and video commentaries. Electronic Arts collaborated with automotive magazine Road & Track to match vehicle behaviour, including the mimicking of the sounds made by the vehicles' gear control levers. The game also contained precise vehicle data with spoken commentary, several "magazine-style" images of each car's interior and exterior and short video clips highlighting the vehicles set to music. The Need for Speed was released in 1994 for the 3DO.

Ports 
In 1996, an edition of The Need for Speed, The Need for Speed: Special Edition, was released only on PC CD-ROM, containing MS-DOS and Windows 95 versions. It includes two new tracks ("Transtropolis" and "Burnt Sienna") and various enhancements to the game engine. The Windows 95 version supports DirectX 2 and IPX networking.

The Need for Speed: Special Edition is the only game in the Need for Speed series to support MS-DOS, as subsequent releases only support Windows 9x.

In June 1995, Atari Corporation struck a deal with EA in order to bring several titles from their catalog (including The Need for Speed) to the Atari Jaguar CD. These ports, along with The Need for Speed, went unreleased.

Japanese versions 
The former's car lineup consists only of Nissan vehicles, whilst the latter exclusively features Skyline models.

Reception 

The game reached number 5 in the UK sales chart. The PC version reached the top ten in many software retailers charts for several months following its release.

The Need For Speed was met with positive reviews. The four reviewers of Electronic Gaming Monthly scored the 3DO version an 8.0 average, with two of them giving the game a 9.0 or higher. They praised the game's realistic graphics and sounds, addictive gameplay, and exceptionally clever use of full motion video. GamePro gave it a rave review as well, commenting that the selection of cars "will leave car buffs drooling" and the realistic graphics and handling of each vehicle "infuse the game with taut realism and fascinating variety." They expressed disappointment over the lack of two-player mode, but felt that the exceptionally challenging enemy AI largely makes up for it. Next Generation reviewed the 3DO version of the game, and stated that "while everything is in place for a truly great game, the unfortunate and total need of speed prevents The Need for Speed from ever being more than a pleasant Sunday drive."

British magazine PC Power gave the Windows version a score of 95%, praising car handling, graphics and overall presentation, but criticizing hardware requirements and sound. Jim Varner of GameSpot gave the game a "Great" rating of 8.3/10 citing "With its marvellous attention to detail, exotic course design, and straightforward gameplay, this game is a true winner. Simply put, The Need for Speed is the next best thing to owning a $200,000 sports car!". The two sports reviewers of Electronic Gaming Monthly applauded the PlayStation version for its fast racing and excellent controls. Air Hendrix argued in GamePro that "With all these improvements, [the PlayStation version] is practically a sequel to the 3DO game, and it plays like one." He made particular mention of the additional courses, the handbrake, the improved displays, and the faster speed of the game. A Next Generation critic likewise found it faster and more responsive than the 3DO version, and held it to be one of the PlayStation's best racing games to date. Other magazines were more critical, with PSM criticising the "obtrusive graphics", and saying that it "isn't an immediately enjoyable game – the idiosyncracies only serve to annoy." Maximum complained that the driving lacks intensity and that cars are too resistant to crashes, though they acknowledged that the graphics are moderately impressive.

Air Hendrix rated the Saturn version as "comparable with – and occasionally better than – the impressive PlayStation version", highlighting the controls in particular as superior to previous versions of the game. He concluded, "The gameplay demands both precision driving and cajones, and although mastery takes time to achieve, Need's ultimately more satisfying than Daytona or Sega Rally." Rob Allsetter of Sega Saturn Magazine, however, said that while The Need for Speed is good on its own terms, it looks dated compared to the two games Air Hendrix referenced. He also disliked the game's elements of realism, arguing that racing games are more fun when they indulge in wild fantasy. A Next Generation critic said it was "Certainly as fast, but not as crisp as the PlayStation version", but nonetheless "A better racer than most."

The Need for Speed was a runner-up for Computer Gaming Worlds 1995 "Action Game of the Year" award, which ultimately went to Crusader: No Remorse. The editors wrote, "The Need for Speed, Electronic Arts' incredibly fast and enthralling driving game, almost caught the checkered flag. Multiple courses with distinctive feels, brilliant SVGA graphics, and some of the hottest iron on the road made this 3DO conversion a worthy entry into the PC action game arena."" In 1996, GamesMaster ranked The Need for Speed 87th on their "Top 100 Games of All Time." In the same issue, they also rated the 3DO version 6th in its "The GamesMaster 3DO Top 10."

See also
 Grand Prix Unlimited, another Road & Track licensed game

Notes and references

Footnotes

Citations

External links 
 

1994 video games
3DO Interactive Multiplayer games
Cancelled Atari Jaguar games
DOS games
Electronic Arts games
 01
PlayStation (console) games
Sega Saturn games
Video games developed in Canada
Video games scored by Jeff van Dyck
Video games with digitized sprites
Windows games
Video games set in the United States
Video games set in Europe
Video games set in the Las Vegas Valley
Video games with alternative versions